The Thurayya Palace was a caliphal palace built in East Baghdad by the Abbasid caliph al-Mu'tadid.

It lay at the Musa Canal, adjacent to the Great Divide, where the canal split in three, some two miles east from the older Hasani Palace, and most likely outside the city wall built around East Baghdad in the 11th century. The Thurayya, Hasani, Firdus, and Taj palaces combined into a sprawling palace complex, the "Abode of the Caliphate", comprising several major and minor residences and gardens. This remained the main caliphal residence for the remainder of the Abbasid Caliphate. 

The Thurayya was connected with the Hasani by an underground passage, which allowed the caliph, his harem, and his servants to move between the palaces unseen. This passage continued to be used until the great floods of 1074 flooded the entirety of East Baghdad. The historian Mas'udi reports that the palace's construction cost 400,000 gold dinars.

References

Sources
 
 

Buildings and structures completed in the 10th century
Abbasid palaces in Baghdad
Former palaces